William Cockburn may refer to:

William Cockburn (physician) (1669–1739), Scottish doctor
Sir William Cockburn, 11th Baronet (1773–1858), Dean of York
William Cockburn (ice hockey) (1902–1975), Canadian ice hockey player
Sir William Cockburn (banker) (1891–1957), Scottish banker and cricketer, manager of the Chartered Bank 1940–55
William Cockburn (Australian cricketer) (1916–2004), Australian cricketer
William Cockburn (footballer) (1889–?), English footballer
William Cockburn (cavalry officer) (died 1683), Royalist Scottish cavalry officer who led operations against Covenanter leaders in Ayrshire and Galloway in the 1670s
Bill Cockburn (1937–1995), English footballer
Sir William Cockburn, 1st Baronet (1627–1628), of the Cockburn baronets
Sir William Cockburn, 2nd Baronet (1628–1650), of the Cockburn baronets
Sir William Cockburn, 3rd Baronet (1650–1657), of the Cockburn baronets
William Cockburn (priest), an Anglican priest who was Archdeacon of Ossory

See also
Cockburn (surname)